The Night Has a Thousand Eyes may refer to:

"The Night Has a Thousand Eyes" (jazz standard), a song written by Jerome (Jerry) Brainin and Buddy Bernier for the 1948 film Night Has a Thousand Eyes
"The Night Has a Thousand Eyes" (song), a popular song by Benjamin Weisman, Dorothy Wayne, and Marilynn Garrett made famous by Bobby Vee.
Night Has a Thousand Eyes, a 1948 American film based on
Night Has a Thousand Eyes, a novel by Cornell Woolrich published under the pseudonym "George Hopley"  
"The Night Has a Thousand Eyes", a poem by Francis William Bourdillon